Michelle Cronin (born February 12, 1987) is a former Canadian pair skater. With Brian Shales, she was the 2005 Canadian junior national champion and placed 7th at the 2005 World Junior Figure Skating Championships. During their career, they trained at the Toronto Cricket Skating and Curling Club.

References

External links
 
 Tracings.net profile

1987 births
Canadian female pair skaters
Living people
Sportspeople from Etobicoke